George Beale Sloan (June 20, 1831 – July 10, 1904) was an American businessman, banker and politician.

Life
George Beale Sloan was born in Oswego, New York, on June 20, 1831. From 1864 to 1884, he was co-owner of the firm of "Sloan & Irwin, flour commissioners" which held a large number of business interests. From 1884 until his death, he was President of the Second National Bank of Oswego.

He was a member of the New York State Assembly (Oswego Co., 1st D.) in 1874, 1876, 1877 and 1879, and was Speaker in 1877.

He was a member of the New York State Senate (21st D.) from 1886 to 1891, sitting in the 109th, 110th, 111th, 112th, 113th and 114th New York State Legislatures. He announced his retirement from politics on May 26, 1891.

In 1892, as a member of the Committee of the Detroit Deep Water Ways Convention in Washington, D.C., he gave his adverse opinion on the ruinously high import duty on Canadian barley.

Sloan was a presidential elector in 1896; and a delegate to the 1900 Republican National Convention.

He died in Oswego on July 10, 1904, and was buried at Riverside Cemetery.

His son George Beale Sloan Jr. committed suicide on July 10, 1914 (exactly 10 years after the death of his father), by jumping from a concrete bridge over Rye Lake at Kensico, New York.

References

1831 births
1904 deaths
Politicians from Oswego, New York
Speakers of the New York State Assembly
New York (state) state senators
American bankers
1896 United States presidential electors
19th-century American businesspeople